The tetragonal disphenoid tetrahedral honeycomb is a space-filling tessellation (or honeycomb) in Euclidean 3-space made up of identical tetragonal disphenoidal cells. Cells are face-transitive with 4 identical isosceles triangle faces. John Horton Conway calls it an oblate tetrahedrille or shortened to obtetrahedrille.

A cell can be seen as 1/12 of a translational cube, with its vertices centered on two faces and two edges. Four of its edges belong to 6 cells, and two edges belong to 4 cells.
 

The tetrahedral disphenoid honeycomb is the dual of the uniform bitruncated cubic honeycomb.

Its vertices form the A / D lattice, which is also known as the body-centered cubic lattice.

Geometry 
This honeycomb's vertex figure is a tetrakis cube: 24 disphenoids meet at each vertex. The union of these 24 disphenoids forms a rhombic dodecahedron. Each edge of the tessellation is surrounded by either four or six disphenoids, according to whether it forms the base or one of the sides of its adjacent isosceles triangle faces respectively. When an edge forms the base of its adjacent isosceles triangles, and is surrounded by four disphenoids, they form an irregular octahedron. When an edge forms one of the two equal sides of its adjacent isosceles triangle faces, the six disphenoids surrounding the edge form a special type of parallelepiped called a trigonal trapezohedron.

 

Hexakis cubic honeycomb 

The hexakis cubic honeycomb is a uniform space-filling tessellation (or honeycomb) in Euclidean 3-space. John Horton Conway calls it a pyramidille.

Cells can be seen in a translational cube, using 4 vertices on one face, and the cube center. Edges are colored by how many cells are around each of them.

It can be seen as a cubic honeycomb with each cube subdivided by a center point into 6 square pyramid cells.

There are two types of planes of faces: one as a square tiling, and flattened triangular tiling with half of the triangles removed as holes.

Related honeycombs 
It is dual to the truncated cubic honeycomb with octahedral and truncated cubic cells:

If the square pyramids of the pyramidille are joined on their bases, another honeycomb is created with identical vertices and edges, called a square bipyramidal honeycomb, or the dual of the rectified cubic honeycomb.

It is analogous to the 2-dimensional tetrakis square tiling:

Square bipyramidal honeycomb 

The square bipyramidal honeycomb is a uniform space-filling tessellation (or honeycomb) in Euclidean 3-space. John Horton Conway calls it an oblate octahedrille or shortened to oboctahedrille.

A cell can be seen positioned within a translational cube, with 4 vertices mid-edge and 2 vertices in opposite faces. Edges are colored and labeled by the number of cells around the edge.

It can be seen as a cubic honeycomb with each cube subdivided by a center point into 6 square pyramid cells. The original cubic honeycomb walls are removed, joining pairs of square pyramids into square bipyramids (octahedra). Its vertex and edge framework is identical to the hexakis cubic honeycomb.

There is one type of plane with faces: a flattened triangular tiling with half of the triangles as holes. These cut face-diagonally through the original cubes. There are also square tiling plane that exist as nonface holes passing through the centers of the octahedral cells.

Related honeycombs 
It is dual to the rectified cubic honeycomb with octahedral and cuboctahedral cells:

Phyllic disphenoidal honeycomb 

The phyllic disphenoidal honeycomb is a uniform space-filling tessellation (or honeycomb) in Euclidean 3-space. John Horton Conway calls this an Eighth pyramidille.

A cell can be seen as 1/48 of a translational cube with vertices positioned: one corner, one edge center, one face center, and the cube center. The edge colors and labels specify how many cells exist around the edge. It is one 1/6 of a smaller cube, with 6 phyllic disphenoidal cells sharing a common diagonal axis.

Related honeycombs 
It is dual to the omnitruncated cubic honeycomb:

See also
Architectonic and catoptric tessellation
Cubic honeycomb
 space frame
Triakis truncated tetrahedral honeycomb

References

.

Honeycombs (geometry)